Merrimac Football Club, is a football club based in Merrimac, Queensland. The club was originally founded in 1978. The club was formally known as Merrimac International Football Club, in reference to its Italian heritage. The club has not fielded a senior men's team since 2017.

Merrimac F.C. is one of two Queensland soccer clubs that are Italian-Australian backed clubs, the other being Brisbane City.

History
Merrimac F.C. is an Australian football club from Gold Coast, Queensland Australia. It was an Italian Australian backed club which was founded in 1978. The club's home ground is Fairway Drive in the suburb of Clear Island Waters. The club used to compete in the Gold Coast Premier League where it was one of the leading sides for the past few decades.

In 2020 ex-professional footballer and captain of Samoa national football team Chris Cahill took over the club. The club now specialises in 5-11yr olds, both boys and girls.

Honours
Seasons in bold indicate doubles with both the respective premiership and championship in a single season.

Football Gold Coast 

 Gold Coast Premier League (first tier)
 Premiership
 Winners (5): 1982, 1983, 1986, 2000, 2012
 Championship
 Winners (4): 1982, 1983, 1986, 1999
 President's Cup
 Winners (2): 1982, 1983
 Men's Coast League 1 / Division 1 (second tier)
 Premiership
 Winners (1): 2010
 Championship
 Winners (2): 1996, 2010
President's Cup
Winners (1): 1996
 BLK Cup / F.A. Cup (Gold Coast domestic cup)
 Winners (4): 1983, 1984, 1985, 1986

References

External links
 Club website

Association football clubs established in 1978
1978 establishments in Australia
Italian-Australian backed sports clubs of Queensland
Soccer teams on the Gold Coast, Queensland